Kadim was an Israeli settlement on a hilltop in the northern West Bank under the administrative jurisdiction of Shomron Regional Council.

History
The settlement, close to Jenin, attracted secular young Israeli families seeking low cost  housing and an idyllic lifestyle. During the Second Intifada, Palestinian snipers used the hilltop outside the perimeter fence to aim into the windows of Kadim homes. In the face of mounting violence, many residents left.

Unilateral disengagement
During seven years of talks that ended in 2001, the possibility of dismantling Kadim was discussed as part of a peace agreement.

In September 2005, Ariel Sharon's plan for unilateral disengagement was implemented and the remaining residents of Kadim were evicted.

See also
 Ganim
 Homesh
 List of villages depopulated during the Arab–Israeli conflict
 Sa-Nur

References

External links
Disengagement Plan of Prime Minister Ariel Sharon - Revised

Villages depopulated during the Arab–Israeli conflict
Former Israeli settlements in the West Bank
Shomron Regional Council
Israeli disengagement from Gaza
Forced migration